James W. Owens (October 24, 1837 – March 30, 1900) was an American lawyer and politician who served two non-consecutive terms as a U.S. Representative from Ohio.

Early life and career 
Born in Franklin County, Indiana, Owens pursued academic studies.
He was graduated from Miami University, Oxford, Ohio, in 1862.
During the Civil War enlisted in the Union Army as a private in the 20th Ohio Infantry, for three months' service.
Reenlisted and was made first lieutenant of Company A, 86th Ohio Infantry, and on the reorganization of that regiment was made captain of Company K.

He attended the law department of the University of Michigan at Ann Arbor in 1864 and 1865.
He was admitted to the bar in 1865 and commenced practice in Newark, Ohio.

He married Martha Kumler of Oxford, Ohio in 1867.

Owens was elected prosecuting attorney of Licking County in 1867 and reelected in 1869.
He owned the Evans–Holton–Owens House in Newark from 1868 to 1870.
Owens was elected to the State Senate in 1875.
He was reelected in 1877 and served as president of that body.
He served as member of the board of trustees of Miami University 1878–1896.

Congress 
Owens was elected as a Democrat to the Fifty-first and Fifty-second Congresses (March 4, 1889 – March 3, 1893).
He served as chairman of the Committee on Expenditures in the Department of the Interior (Fifty-second Congress).
He was not a candidate for renomination in 1892.

Later career and death 
He resumed the practice of his profession.
He died in Newark, Ohio, on March 30, 1900.
He was interred in Cedar Hill Cemetery.

Sources

1837 births
1900 deaths
County district attorneys in Ohio
Miami University alumni
Miami University trustees
Democratic Party members of the United States House of Representatives from Ohio
Politicians from Newark, Ohio
People of Ohio in the American Civil War
Presidents of the Ohio State Senate
Union Army officers
University of Michigan Law School alumni
Burials at Cedar Hill Cemetery, Newark, Ohio
People from Franklin County, Indiana
19th-century American politicians